HD 87883 b is an extrasolar planet which orbits the K-type main sequence star HD 87883, located approximately 59 light years away in the constellation Leo Minor. It is a long-period planet, taking 8.23 years to orbit the star at the average distance of 3.77 AU. However, this planet orbits in a very eccentric path, which ranges distance from as close as 1.06 AU to as far as 6.48 AU. This planet was detected by the radial velocity method on August 13, 2009.

Astrometry of HD 87883 has determined an orbital inclination of either 16.8° or 163.2°, depending on whether the solution is prograde or retrograde.

References

Exoplanets discovered in 2009
Giant planets
Leo Minor
Exoplanets detected by radial velocity
Exoplanets detected by astrometry